Howitt Fielding (22 August 1914 – 1982) was an English professional footballer who played in the Football League for Mansfield Town.

References

1914 births
1982 deaths
English footballers
Association football forwards
English Football League players
Ilkeston United F.C. players
Reading F.C. players
Mansfield Town F.C. players
Peterborough United F.C. players